Jeff Sendobry is a retired American soccer defender who spent one season in the American Soccer League and four in the Major Indoor Soccer League.

Sendobry grew up in St. Louis where he attended Christian Brothers College High School.  He began his collegiate career at St. Louis Community College where he was a 1977 Honorable Mention (third team) NJCAA All American.
He then attended the Indiana University where he played on the men's soccer team in 1978 and 1979.  In 1980, he played for the Cleveland Cobras in the American Soccer League.  In the fall of 1980, he signed with the expansion St. Louis Steamers  of the Major Indoor Soccer League.  He remained with the Steamers until 1984.

References

External links
 MISL stats

1958 births
American soccer players
American Soccer League (1933–1983) players
Cleveland Cobras players
Indiana Hoosiers men's soccer players
Major Indoor Soccer League (1978–1992) players
St. Louis Steamers players
Living people
Association football defenders
Soccer players from Missouri